Khvoy Narud (also Romanized as Khvoy Narūd and Khūynarūd) is a village in Bakrabad Rural District, in the Central District of Varzaqan County, East Azerbaijan Province, Iran. At the 2006 census, its population was 56, in 14 families.

References 

Towns and villages in Varzaqan County